Mayanginen Thayanginen is a 2012 Tamil romantic-thriller film written and directed by T. S. Vendan, who earlier directed Inba. The film stars Nithin Sathya and Disha Pandey in the lead roles with Pawan, Tarun Shatriya and Tejashree in supporting roles. The film which was in production since 2010 was finally released on 1 June 2012 and received negative reviews.

Cast

 Nithin Sathya as Muthukumar
 Disha Pandey as Shruthi
 Ajay Rathnam as Kalivaradhan
 Ganja Karuppu as Muthukumar's friend
 Pawan as Muthukumar's friend
 Tarun Shatriya as Muthukumar's friend
 Tejashree as Kalivaradhan's wife
 T. P. Gajendran
 A. C. Murali Mohan
 T. R. Bala
 Rekha Suresh
 Rishi Vandana
 Sanjana Singh as item number

Production 
Nithin Sathya was cast as a cab driver.  Disha Pandey, who previously starred in Thamizh Padam (2010), was cast as the heroine. Her role in the film is a customer care executive.

Soundtrack
The songs are composed by Kannan, who previously worked for Thamizh Padam (2010).

 "Aadi Varum Theru" - Mukesh, Chinnaponnu
 "Kanavinil Neeyum" - Vijay Prakash
 "Mayanginen Thayanginen" - Sathyaprakash
 "Kadavulin Koil" - Shweta Mohan
 "Unnai Vittu Ponaal" - Haricharan
 "Mayanginen Thayanginen" - Thilaka

Release 
Behindwoods gave the film a rating of zero out of five stars and stated that "On the whole Vendhan’s Mayanginen Thayanginen is a strenuous watch". Reviews from Maalaimalar and Dinamalar were also negative.

References

External links 

2012 films
2010s Tamil-language films
Indian romance films
2010s romance films